Londra may be:
the Italian, Romanian and Turkish name for London, UK
 Michael Londra (born 1965), Irish singer and theatrical producer
 Paulo Londra (born 1998), Argentine rapper, singer and composer

See also 
 
 Londre